Marly Marley (5 April 1938 – 10 January 2014) was a Brazilian actress.

Marly Marley died from pancreatic cancer on 10 January 2014, aged 75, in São Paulo, São Paulo. She was survived by her husband, actor and comedian Ary Toledo.

Filmography

References

External links

1938 births
2014 deaths
People from Três Lagoas
Brazilian film actresses
Brazilian television actresses
Brazilian stage actresses
Deaths from pancreatic cancer
Deaths from cancer in São Paulo (state)